Metamusicians' Stomp is an album by American jazz drummer Andrew Cyrille recorded in 1978 for the Italian Black Saint label.

Reception

The AllMusic review by Scott Yanow awarded the album 4 stars stating "This intriguing set gives listeners an early glimpse of the great avant-garde tenor saxophonist David Ware, who is well featured with drummer Andrew Cyrille's quartet... This is a stimulating program that is easily recommended". The authors of the Penguin Guide to Jazz Recordings awarded the album 3½ stars, and wrote that it demonstrates Cyrille's "increasing interest in an Africanized language for jazz..." They stated that what the album seems to suggest is that "the further jazz goes back towards its point of ancestral departure, the more completely it is itself."

Nate Chinen, writing for The New York Times, called it an "earthy and exploratory album, featuring a captivating young tenor saxophonist, David S. Ware, alongside the slashing trumpeter Ted Daniel." In an article for the Akbank Sanat web site, Cem Kayiran commented: "With its rich rhythmical structures and highlighting of every song with a different feeling, Metamusicians' Stomp is an album that every free jazz fan can happily get lost in."

Track listing
All compositions by Andrew Cyrille except as indicated
 "Metamusicians' Stomp" - 6:41 
 "My Ship" (Ira Gershwin, Kurt Weill) - 7:05 
 "5-4-3-2" - 4:54 
 "Spiegelgasse 14: Reflections + Restaurants/The Park/Flight" - 21:44
Recorded at Ricordi Studios in Milano, Italy in September 1978

Personnel
Andrew Cyrille - drums, percussion, foot
Ted Daniel - trumpet, flugelhorn, wood flute, foot 
David S. Ware - flute, tenor saxophone, foot
Nick DiGeronimo - bass, foot

References

Black Saint/Soul Note albums
Andrew Cyrille albums
1978 albums
Avant-garde jazz albums